Antonio Pérez Agudo (born 2 February 1977) known professionally as Antonio Pagudo is a Spanish actor.

Career
He made appearances in theater, television and films. He played in the spectaclesSpingo or Star Trip, in which he did a tour in Spain and in foreign countries. He was known for his role as Javier Maroto in the TV series La que se avecina. He also appeared during two years in Arrayán.

In films he appeared in Mi tío Paco, directed by Tacho González, and El Síndrome de Svenson, directed by Kepa Sojo. In 2013 he voiced Reggie in Free Birds.

In 2014 he portrayed Fedria in The Eunuch by  Terence, a comedy directed by Pep Antón Gómez for the XL edición del Festival Internacional de Teatro Clásico de Mérida.

Filmography

Films
 Asesinato en el Hormiguero Express (2018) as himself
 Los futbolísimos (2018)
 Villaviciosa de al lado (2016) as Juandi
 Interlinings (2015) as Juanito
 Una mañana cualquiera (2015) as Protagonist passenger
 Amateur (2013) as Dionisio
 Save the Zombies (2013) as Borja
 ¿Quién es Florinda Bolkan? (2010) as Diego
 'Desechos (2010) as Talín
 Salir pitando (2007) as Cliente Hombre
 Línea 57 (2006) as Toni
 GAL (2006) as Secretario de Estado
 El síndrome de Svensson (2006) as Teles
 Mi tío Paco (2006) as Paco

TV
 Terror y feria (2019)
 La que se avecina (2007-2017) as Javi Maroto
 Lo que escondían sus ojos (2016) as Dionisio Ridruejo
 Cuéntame cómo pasó'' (2005-2007) as Sergio

References

External links
 
 
 
 

1977 births
Male actors from Andalusia
Spanish male television actors
Spanish male stage actors
20th-century Spanish male actors
21st-century Spanish male actors
Living people